James Dyer (born 1809, England; died 24 November 1876, New Cross, Kent) was an English cricketer who was associated with Kent and made his first-class debut in 1830.

References

Bibliography
 

1809 births
1876 deaths
English cricketers
English cricketers of 1826 to 1863
Gentlemen of Kent cricketers